Saori (Japanese: 張 佐緖里, Korean: 장은주, Hanja: 張恩珠), born May 19, 1981, is a third-generation Japanese-born Korean who gained fame through guest appearances on KBS's  Global Beauties Chat (미녀들의 수다).

Career
Saori's work has varied, and she appears on variety shows as well as commercials, mostly in Japan. In Korea, she appeared in MBC reality show We Got Married, where she was paired up with Jung Hyung Don. However, the couple "divorced" after 8 episodes, Saori left the show while Hyung Don remained behind as a host.

Saori became a singer in 2008, releasing her first single Happy Virus! in May. She quickly gained much popularity.

References

1981 births
Living people
Kyung Hee Cyber University alumni
Zainichi Korean people
Place of birth missing (living people)